Daphnella hedya is a species of sea snail, a marine gastropod mollusk in the family Raphitomidae.

Description
The length of the shell attains 14 mm, its diameter 5 mm.

The fusiform shell shows chestnut markings. It contains nine whorls of which 3½ subhyaline whorls in the protoconch. The subsequent whorls are elegantly rounded. The shell has a minute, gemmuliferous decussation. The smallish aperture is oblong. The outer lip is slightly inflated and smooth on the inside. The sinus is not deep. The purple siphonal canal bends slightly backwards.

Distribution
This marine species occurs in the Persian Gulf.

References

External links
 

hedya
Gastropods described in 1903